Elements of Anger is the fourth album by the American thrash metal band Sadus.

This album marked the band's first release under Mascot and Taraneh Records and also the first without guitarist Rob Moore.

Track listing

Credits
Darren Travis – guitar, vocals
Steve Di Giorgio – bass, keyboards
Jon Allen – drums

References

1998 albums
Sadus albums
Albums produced by Scott Burns (record producer)
Mascot Records albums
Technical death metal albums